Delhi is an unincorporated community in Beckham County, Oklahoma, United States. The community is named for the city in India and first had a post office in 1893.

References

Unincorporated communities in Beckham County, Oklahoma
Unincorporated communities in Oklahoma